Arachnomyces is a genus of cleistothecial ascomycete fungi described in 1902, of which the anamorph (asexual) stage is the genus Onychocola. Although morphologically similar to members of other families, the fungus now belongs to its own monotypic family Arachnomycetaceae, which is the only family in the monotypic order Arachnomycetales.

Phylogeny
The placement of Arachnomyces has changed multiple times due to its morphological similarities to members of different families. When first described in 1902, it was included in the old family Perisporiaceae. Later it was considered as part of Onygenaceae, then it was placed within the Gymnoascaceae in 1996. Thanks to phylogenetic analyses Arachnomyces is currently recognized as a distinct monophyletic lineage, composing its own family Arachnomycetaceae and order Arachnomycetales within the class Eurotiomycetes.

Taxonomy
There are currently 16 accepted species of Arachnomyces.
 Arachnomyces bostrychodes 
 Arachnomyces flavidulus 
 Arachnomyces glareosus 
 Arachnomyces graciliformis 
 Arachnomyces gracilis 
 Arachnomyces jinanicus 
 Arachnomyces kanei  (anamorph Onychocola kanei)
 Arachnomyces minimus 
 Arachnomyces minutus 
 Arachnomyces nitidus 
 Arachnomyces nodosetosus  (anamorph Onychocola canadensis)
 Arachnomyces peruvianus   [=Anixiopsis peruviana ; =Xanthothecium peruvianum ]
 Arachnomyces pilosus  [=Chrysosporium pilosus ]
 Arachnomyces scleroticus  [=Malbranchea sclerotica ; =Onychocola sclerotica ]
 Arachnomyces sulphureus 
 Arachnomyces validus

References

Eurotiomycetes